Druye is a commune in the Indre-et-Loire department, central France.

Population
The inhabitants are called Druyens or Druyennes.

See also
 Communes of the Indre-et-Loire department

References

Communes of Indre-et-Loire